Ronnie Gustave (born 30 May 1972) is a Dominican football manager, who is the manager of Dominica national football team.

References

External links

Living people
1972 births
Dominica football managers
Dominica national football team managers